La Cabanasse is a commune in the Pyrénées-Orientales department in southern France.

Geography

Localisation 
La Cabanasse is located in the canton of Les Pyrénées catalanes and in the arrondissement of Prades.

Government and politics

Mayors

Population

See also

Communes of the Pyrénées-Orientales department

References

Communes of Pyrénées-Orientales